The Mattauch isobar rule, formulated by Josef Mattauch in 1934, states that if two adjacent elements on the periodic table have isotopes of the same mass number, one of these isotopes must be radioactive. Two nuclides that have the same mass number (isobars) can both be stable only if their atomic numbers differ by more than one. In fact, for currently observationally stable nuclides, the difference can only be 2 or 4, and in theory, two nuclides that have the same mass number cannot be both stable (at least to beta decay or double beta decay), but many such nuclides which are theoretically unstable to double beta decay have not been observed to decay, e.g. 134Xe. However, this rule cannot make predictions on the half-lives of these radioisotopes.

Technetium and promethium
A consequence of this rule is that technetium and promethium both have no stable isotopes, as each of the neighboring elements on the periodic table (molybdenum and ruthenium, and neodymium and samarium, respectively) have a beta-stable isotope for each mass number for the range in which the isotopes of the unstable elements usually would be stable to beta decay. (Note that although 147Sm is unstable, it is stable to beta decay; thus 147 is not a counterexample). These ranges can be calculated using the liquid drop model (for example the stability of technetium isotopes), in which the isobar with the lowest mass excess or greatest binding energy is shown to be stable to beta decay because energy conservation forbids a spontaneous transition to a less stable state.

Thus no stable nuclides have proton number 43 or 61, and by the same reasoning no stable nuclides have neutron number 19, 21, 35, 39, 45, 61, 71, 89, 115, or 123.

Exceptions
The only known exceptions to the Mattauch isobar rule are the cases of antimony-123 and tellurium-123 and of hafnium-180 and tantalum-180m, where both nuclei are observationally stable. It is predicted that 123Te would undergo electron capture to form 123Sb, but this decay has not yet been observed; 180mTa should be able to undergo isomeric transition to 180Ta, beta decay to 180W, electron capture to 180Hf, or alpha decay to 176Lu, but none of these decay modes have been observed.

In addition, beta decay has been seen for neither curium-247 nor berkelium-247, though it is expected that the former should decay into the latter. Both nuclides are alpha-unstable.

References

Nuclear physics